Arthur Scott may refer to:

Arthur E. Scott (1917–1976), American photo-historian
Arthur Scott (footballer) (1878–1957), Australian rules footballer
Arthur Scott (rower) (1887–1966), Australian Olympic rower
Arthur Scott (cricketer, born 1883) (1883–1968), English cricketer and Royal Navy officer
Arthur Scott (cricketer, born 1885) (1885—1933), English cricketer and businessman
Sir Arthur Scott of the Bateman baronets

See also

Scott (surname)